The 1925–26 season was Blackpool F.C.'s 25th season (22nd consecutive) in the Football League. They competed in the 22-team Division Two, then the second tier of English football, finishing sixth.

Bert Fishwick was the club's top scorer, with nineteen goals.

Season synopsis
It was a slow start to the season, with only two victories procured in their first eight games.

Despite Harry Bedford being sold to Derby County in late September, Blackpool's fortunes began to change. Bert Fishwick, signed from Plymouth Argyle as Bedford's replacement, assisted in a recovery that saw the club vanquish the previous campaign's tussle with relegation from their minds.

Table

Transfers

In

Out

Notes

References

Blackpool F.C.
Blackpool F.C. seasons